Salsburg may refer to:
 David Salsburg (born 1931), an American author
Variant spelling of
 Salsburgh, North Lanarkshire, Scotland.
 Salzburg (disambiguation)

See also
 Salzberg (disambiguation)
 Salisbury (disambiguation)